is a Japanese politician who is a member of the Liberal Democratic Party serving in the House of Representatives.

A native of Tokyo, he graduated from the University of Tokyo and then worked at the Ministry of Finance. He was elected for the first time in the 2005 general election.

References 
 

1977 births
Living people
People from Tokyo
University of Tokyo alumni
Koizumi Children
Members of the House of Representatives (Japan)
Liberal Democratic Party (Japan) politicians